Khirbet ed-Dharih is an archaeological site including a Nabataean settlement and religious sanctuary outside of Petra, Jordan. The site is located in southern Jordan, in the city of Tafileh, 100 km north of Petra. The earliest signs of human habitation at the site are from the Neolithic period and more specifically the Pre-Pottery Neolithic  period circa 4000-6000 BCE.

In Arabic, khirbet means ruin and is commonly used to describe archaeological ruins, while the word Al Dharih according to the Arabic Dictionary , means hills or highlands. Khirbet ed- Dharih therefore can be translated as the ruin’s of ed- Dharih or the ruins of the highlands. The site name reflects the topography of the site.

History of archaeological excavation at the site
Khirbet ed-Dharih has been excavated by archaeologists over 13 seasons between the years 1984 and 2007. The importance of the site centers around its ability to provide important answers to questions about life outside of the capital at Petra during the Nabatean period. In particular, the site sheds light on aspects of religious, social, and economic life in the Nabatean period.

The site is surrounded by fertile agricultural land and well-watered by spring water, such as the Le’ban spring, all of which contributed to making the site a natural center for human habitation.

Archaeological evidence indicates that Khirbet ed Dharih was settled as early as the Pre Pottery Neolithic period (4000-6000 BCE) and continued into the Bronze Age. Archaeologists Zeidoun Al Muheisin and François Villeneuve argue that Edomite artifacts found at the site confirm that it was settled during the Edomite period. The site became of particular significance in the Nabatean period, however, there is evidence to suggest continuous settlement at the site throughout the  Roman, Byzantine, and Islamic periods.

At the site, archaeologists have found both a Nabataean town as well as a monumental temple complex.

Geographic location
Jordanian archeologist Zaidoun Al Muheisin describes the location of ed-Darih: “Situated at the northern end of Wadi Al Le’ban (وادي اللعبان) in the south of Jordan. Wadi Al Le’ban, located northeast of the city of Tafileh is one of the main tributaries of Wadi al Hassa, which includes many water basins, the most important of which are the Thahr Al Le’ban and Ayn Al Le’ban (Le’ban Spring). This region consists of a relatively flat plateau which is 10 km from north to south and 30 km from east to west. The climate and vegetation of the plateau varied widely, in some areas the land was very fertile in others not at all. The land becomes less fertile as you move east towards the desert. The area to the west of the Wadi Al-Le’ban was cultivated with grains, especially wheat. It enjoys a  traditional Mediterranean climate with its wet winters and dry summers. The highlands receive most of the rain and even snow. The longest valleys of the plateau are less than 10 km long, with the exception of the Wadi Al-Le’ban, which connects to the Al-Hasma valley with a length of 25 km stretching from its source in Mount Tannour. The red soil of this region is classified as Terra Rossa Mediterranee, which is commonly found in the Mediterranean basin. The area is well known for its many springs (ayn in Arabic) such as Ain ed-Dharih, Ain al-Thaban, Ain al-Fadhah, and these springs are an important source for the irrigation of agricultural lands. Khirbet ed-Dhairh is famous for the cultivation of olive trees, grapevines, grains, cereals, and various types of vegetables.

The average rainfall in the region is 200 mm per annum. Khirbet ed-Darih was distinguished by its strategic geographic location, due to its proximity to the major trade routes, in addition to the minor subsidiary trade routes leading to the Jordan Valley, Palestine and Gaza. The importance of the site is also due, especially in the Nabataean period, to its proximity to the temple of Khirbet al-Tannour, which is about 7 km north. Khirbet al- Tannour, which was built on top of the high mountain of Tannour, was one of the most important religious centers and a site of pilgrimage for the Nabateans. This site is also of importance due to its proximity to the hot springs of Afra and Rabita spots, both located a few kilometers away to the west.

External links
 A collection of digitized archival photos of the site via the ACOR Photo Archive

Notes

Populated places established in the 6th millennium BC
1984 archaeological discoveries
Archaeological sites in Jordan
Tafilah Governorate
Nabataean sites in Jordan
Pre-Pottery Neolithic
Neolithic sites of Asia